Nicholas C. Barberis (born September 1971) is the Stephen & Camille Schramm Professor of Finance at the Yale School of Management. Professor Barberis' research focuses on behavioral finance and in particular, on applications of cognitive psychology to understanding the pricing of financial assets.

Barberis attended Eltham College in London, UK, earned his B.A. from Jesus College, Cambridge in 1991 and Ph.D. from Harvard University in 1996.

References

External links
 Official website at Yale University

1971 births
Living people
British economists
Alumni of Jesus College, Cambridge
Harvard Graduate School of Arts and Sciences alumni
People educated at Eltham College
Yale University faculty